Tapinoma schreiberi is a species of ant in the genus Tapinoma. Described by Hamm in 2010, the species is endemic to the United States.

References

Tapinoma
Hymenoptera of North America
Insects of the United States
Insects described in 2010